Snezhanka ("Snow White") is a show cave in the Rhodope Mountains,  away from the town of Peshtera, southern Bulgaria. It was discovered in 1961.

The cave is rich in stalactites, stalagmites, draperies and sinter lakes. It consists of several halls: Udders Hall, The Large Hall, The Music Hall, linked by the Toppling over which a metal bridge runs. In the Wonderful Hall, built by snow-white crystal sinter, nature has shaped a figure, often likened to the fairy-tale character Snow White, after which the cave was named.

In the middle of the cave there are circular hearths, where animal bones and artifacts dating back to early Iron Age were discovered. The Thracians used the cave as a refuge from their enemies. 

Snezhanka is among the 100 National Touristic Places of the Bulgarian Touristic Union. The cave is open to visitors.

Tourist attractions in Pazardzhik Province
Show caves in Bulgaria
Rhodope Mountains
Limestone caves